Daré Nibombé (born 16 June 1980) is a Togolese former professional footballer who played as a centre-back. He became the head coach of the U21 squad of Tubize in 2017.

Club career

Early career
Born in Lomé, Nibombé started his football career in Togo. In 1999, he was transferred to ASKO Kara. After two years he was transferred to Ghanaian team Liberty Professionals F.C. but after a couple of seasons, Nibombé returned to AS Douanes in Togo.

R.A.E.C. Mons
In 2003, Nibombé moved to Belgian team R.A.E.C. Mons where he spent five seasons.

CS Otopeni
In 2008, Nibombé rejected moves to Italy, France and Greece and instead moved to CS Otopeni.

Politehnica Timișoara
In January 2009, Nibombé signed with FC Politehnica Timișoara who were in the UEFA Champions League  qualifying rounds. He played a Champions League game against UEFA Cup holders Shakhtar Donetsk and FC Timişoara won over the two legs. The next tie in the UEFA Champions League was against VfB Stuttgart.

During the 2009–10 season, Nibombé established himself as a central defender in Liga 1. On 15 June 2010, he left FC Timişoara to join FK Baku.

FC Baku
Nibombé signed for FK Baku.

Arminia Bielefeld
After six months in Azerbaijan, he left Baku to sign for 2. Bundesliga club Arminia Bielefeld. He played a few games with the German outfit then was away for a couple of months due to an injury.

International career
Nibombé was a regular member of the Togo national team, and was a starter at the 2006 World Cup and the 2006 African Cup of Nations. He also participated at the African Cup of Nations.

Honours
AS Douanes
Togolese Championnat National: 2002

La Louvière
Belgian Cup: 2002–03

RAEC Mons
Belgian Second Division: 2005–06

References

External links
 

1980 births
Living people
Sportspeople from Lomé
Togolese footballers
Association football defenders
Togo international footballers
2006 FIFA World Cup players
2006 Africa Cup of Nations players
2013 Africa Cup of Nations players
Belgian Pro League players
Liga I players
2. Bundesliga players
ASKO Kara players
AS Douanes (Togo) players
Liberty Professionals F.C. players
R.A.A. Louviéroise players
R.A.E.C. Mons players
CS Otopeni players
FC Politehnica Timișoara players
FC Baku players
Arminia Bielefeld players
R.F.C. Seraing (1922) players
Togolese expatriate sportspeople in Belgium
Expatriate footballers in Belgium
Togolese expatriate sportspeople in Romania
Expatriate footballers in Romania
Togolese expatriate sportspeople in Germany
Expatriate footballers in Germany
Togolese expatriate sportspeople in Azerbaijan
Expatriate footballers in Azerbaijan
21st-century Togolese people
Francs Borains players